Grosvenor Park Productions is an American production and film-financing company. It is owned by Canadian film financing mogul Don Starr, headquartered in Los Angeles, California, and has an international office in London, England.

Filmography
 White Fang (1993)
 Starhunter (2000)
 Buffalo Soldiers (2001)
 Spider (2002)
 Cybermutt (2002)
 Stander (2003)
 Penelope (2006/2008)
 The Good Night (2007)
 P.S. I Love You (2007)
 Battle in Seattle (2007)
 Love in the Time of Cholera (2007)
 Disaster Movie (2008)
 The Hurt Locker (2008)
 Defiance (2008)
 Righteous Kill (2008)
 Mutant Chronicles (2008)
 While She Was Out (2008)
 Powder Blue (2008)
 New York, I Love You (2009)
 Thick as Thieves (2009)
 Ghost in the Shell (2017)

References

External links
 

Film production companies of the United States
Companies based in Los Angeles